Consumer guide or Consumer Guide may refer to the following:

Publications
Robert Christgau's "Consumer Guide", a column in The Village Voice
Christgau's Consumer Guide: Albums of the '90s, a book collecting reviews from Christgau's column during the 1990s
The New Green Consumer Guide, a lifestyle book by Julia Hailes

See also
Consumer protection
Consumer Reports